Clearing the Channel is Sinch's follow-up to their 2002 self-titled album. The band signed up with independent rock label Rock Ridge Music for this release, after their contract with Roadrunner Records wasn't renewed.

Track listing

References

Sinch (band) albums
2005 albums